Glina is a town in central Croatia, located southwest of Petrinja and Sisak in the Sisak-Moslavina County. It lies on the eponymous river Glina.

History

Early history
Glina was first mentioned as a city on 1 June 1284. Later in September 1737, during the threat of the Turks, the Croatian Sabor met in Glina. It was also a post of Ban Jelačić when he became the commander the Military Frontier during the Turkish threat.

During the mid-18th century, Count Ivan Drašković created Freemason lodges in several Croatian cities and towns, including Glina, where officers and other members shared ideas of the Jacobins from the French Revolution, until Emperor Francis II banned them in 1798. In the late 19th and early 20th century, Glina was a district capital in the Zagreb County of the Kingdom of Croatia-Slavonia.

World War II

During World War II, Glina was part of the Independent State of Croatia established by the Axis powers as a result of the Invasion of Yugoslavia. There were two major Ustashe massacres of Serbs in Glina in 1941. On the night of 11 May, Ustaše arrested male Serbs over the age of sixteen, regardless of occupation or class. The men were first imprisoned in a small holding area of a former gendarmerie building, then on the night of 12 May, they were tied up in pairs, loaded into trucks and taken to a large pit where they were killed, primarily with guns. Historian Slavko Goldstein writes that "less than four hundred, but certainly higher than three hundred" were killed in total.

Another massacre occurred on 30 July-2 August when 700 Serbs were gathered under the threat of forced conversion and executed in the local Serbian Orthodox Church. The dates as well as the number of victims in this massacre are disputed in sources. According to Italian reports, in total, more than 18,000 Serbs were killed in the district of Glina during the war. The Yugoslav Partisans attacked Glina and Hrastovica in late November 1943. The position was held by the Nazi Germany army with support from the Danish 11th SS Volunteer Panzergrenadier Division Nordland. The Partisans liberated and entered the town on January 11, 1944.

Socialist Yugoslavia 
After the end of war in 1964, the Committee for the Construction of Memorials to the July Victims of Fascist Terror in Banija and Kordun sent a request to the Veterans Associations of the People’s Liberation War of Yugoslavia (SUBNOR) to finally build a memorial as the failure to do so was particularly affecting the brotherhood and unity of the people in this region. A memorial house was thereafter built on the site of the destroyed Orthodox church and in 1985, its Executive Committee requested assistance in creating a permanent display for the museum which read: "the Ustasha slaughtered around 1,200 Serbs from the surroundings of Glina on August 2, 1941", noting that it marked the beginning of the Genocide of Serbs in the Independent State of Croatia.

Yugoslav wars
In the early summer of 1991, the first major armed clashes between Croatian forces and rebelled Serbs took place in the Glina area. On June 26, a day after the declaration of independence of Croatia, a group of armed Serbs attacked the local police station. The second armed attack followed a month later, on July 26. Serb militias were reported to have used ethnic Croats as human shields in the conflict. Civilians from both sides died as a result of the fighting in Glina. Croatian Police and National Guard units had to withdraw while Croats from Glina (including Jukinac) took refuge in Donji and Gornji Viduševac, villages north of Glina that were free at the time. Subsequently, Glina was completely controlled by the Yugoslav People's Army and the Serb rebels. The remaining non-Serb population from Glina and the surrounding area were mostly expelled while many were taken to internment camps. During the war, Serbs occupied the territory up to the Kupa river, which was followed by many crimes against the civilians in Novo Selo Glinsko, Stankovci and Bučič area. In 1995, future President of Serbia Aleksandar Vučić held a meeting in Glina during which he stated, among others that Glina would never be part of Croatia and advocated for it to be a part of Greater Serbia. A total of 396 Croatian civilians and soldiers were killed in Glina during the war. On 6 August 1995, Glina was returned to Croatia by the Croatian Army during Operation Storm. At the same time, most ethnic Serbs fled. In December 2015, the bodies of 56 Serb civilians and soldiers killed during the action were exhumed from a mass grave in the Gornje Selište municipality.

Recent
The area of Glina suffered extensive damage during the 2020 Petrinja earthquake.

Demographics

The results are for the whole municipality of Glina which was larger during previous censuses. In some censuses, people listed themselves as Yugoslavs (not Serbs or Croats).

Settlements

The settlements part of the administrative area of Glina, total population 9,283 (census 2011), include:

 Balinac, population 69
 Baturi, population 0
 Bijele Vode, population 67
 Bišćanovo, population 0
 Bojna, population 28
 Borovita, population 17
 Brestik, population 76
 Brezovo Polje, population 24
 Brnjeuška, population 13
 Brubno, population 4
 Buzeta, population 67
 Dabrina, population 86
 Desni Degoj, population 86
 Dolnjaki, population 102
 Donja Bučica, population 54
 Donja Trstenica, population 0
 Donje Jame, population 22
 Donje Selište, population 109
 Donje Taborište, population 40
 Donji Klasnić, population 90
 Donji Selkovac, population 1
 Donji Viduševac, population 179
 Dragotina, population 149
 Drenovac Banski, population 74
 Dvorišće, population 99
 Glina, population 4,680
 Gornja Bučica, population 128
 Gornje Jame, population 0
 Gornje Selište, population 55
 Gornje Taborište, population 56
 Gornji Klasnić, population 41
 Gornji Selkovac, population 0
 Gornji Viduševac, population 468
 Gračanica Šišinečka, population 24
 Hađer, population 50
 Hajtić, population 32
 Ilovačak, population 93
 Joševica, population 37
 Kihalac, population 50
 Kozaperovica, population 46
 Maja, population 168
 Majske Poljane, population 196
 Majski Trtnik, population 36
 Mala Solina, population 15
 Mali Gradac, population 143
 Mali Obljaj, population 34
 Marinbrod, population 93
 Martinovići, population 71
 Momčilovića Kosa, population 36
 Novo Selo Glinsko, population 118
 Prekopa, population 143
 Prijeka, population 57
 Ravno Rašće, population 129
 Roviška, population 46
 Skela, population 41
 Slatina Pokupska, population 88
 Stankovac, population 24
 Svračica, population 44
 Šaševa, population 26
 Šatornja, population 176
 Šibine, population 28
 Trnovac Glinski, population 31
 Trtnik Glinski, population 14
 Turčenica, population 0
 Velika Solina, population 69
 Veliki Gradac, population 126
 Veliki Obljaj, population 22
 Vlahović, population 73
 Zaloj, population 20

Notable people from Glina
 Natko Devčić, Croatian composer
 Slavko Hirsch, Croatian physician
 Zlatko Šulentić, Croatian painter
 Branka Bakšić Mitić, humanitarian and vice-mayor of Glina

References

Sources

External links

 

 
Cities and towns in Croatia
Populated places in Sisak-Moslavina County
Zagreb County (former)
Banovina